The International Racquetball Federation's 19th Racquetball World Championships are being held in San José, Costa Rica from August 10 to 18. This is the first time Worlds have been Costa Rica, and the first time a Central American country has hosted the event. 

Bolivians Valeria Centellas and Yasmine Sabja won the Women’s Doubles World Championship for the first time in their careers, and their win was the first for South American women at Worlds. They defeated the Mexican team of Alexandra Herrera and Monsserrat Mejia in the final in three games, including fighting off a match point in game two, winning 8–15, 15–14, 11–2. Centellas and Sabja beat the Guatemala team of Maria Rene Rodriguez and Gabriela Martinez in the semi-finals by injury default, as Martinez hurt her left arm in the second game, and while they finished that game, they couldn't complete the match. Herrera and Mejia defeated Colombians Cristina Amaya and Adriana Riveros in the other semi.

Tournament format
The 2018 World Championships was a two-stage competition. There was an initial group stage played as a round robin with the results used to seed teams for the medal  round.

Group stage

Pool A

Pool B

Pool C

Pool D

Medal round

References

2018 Racquetball World Championships